The Yaquina Bay Bridge is an arch bridge that spans Yaquina Bay south of Newport, Oregon. It is one of the most recognizable of the U.S. Route 101 bridges designed by Conde McCullough and one of eleven major bridges on the Oregon Coast Highway designed by him. It superseded the last ferry crossing on the highway.

History
Work on the Yaquina Bay Bridge began on August 1, 1934. The bridge opened on September 6, 1936, at a cost of $1,301,016 ($ in today's dollars). A total of 220 people worked to pour 30,000 cubic yards (23,000 m³) of concrete and fabricate 3,100 tons of steel. The contractors were the Gilpin Construction Company of Portland, Oregon, and the General Construction Company of Seattle, Washington. The main arch was built in toward the center from the anchorages, using tiebacks to support the arch until it could be closed. The project received funding from the Public Works Administration.

Description
The  main span is a semi-through arch, with the roadway penetrating the middle of the arch. It is flanked by identical  steel deck arches, with five concrete deck arches of diminishing size extending to the south landing. The main arch is marked by tall obelisk-like concrete finials on the main piers, with smaller decorative elements marking the ends of the flanking spans. The arches are built as box girders.

The bridge uses Art Deco and Art Moderne design motifs as well as forms borrowed from Gothic architecture. The Gothic influence is seen in the balustrade, which features small pointed arches, and in the arches of the side span piers. The ends of the bridge are augmented by pedestrian plazas that afford a view of the bridge and provide access to the parks at the landings by stairways. Pedestals were provided for proposed sculptures of seals, but the statues were never executed.

Designation
The Yaquina Bay Bridge was placed on the National Register of Historic Places on August 5, 2005.

Gallery

See also

List of bridges documented by the Historic American Engineering Record in Oregon
List of bridges on the National Register of Historic Places in Oregon
List of bridges on U.S. Route 101 in Oregon
National Register of Historic Places listings in Lincoln County, Oregon

References

External links

Bridges completed in 1936
Newport, Oregon
Through arch bridges in the United States
Open-spandrel deck arch bridges in the United States
Road bridges on the National Register of Historic Places in Oregon
U.S. Route 101
Bridges in Lincoln County, Oregon
Historic American Engineering Record in Oregon
Bridges by Conde McCullough
Public Works Administration in Oregon
Bridges of the United States Numbered Highway System
National Register of Historic Places in Lincoln County, Oregon
1936 establishments in Oregon
Concrete bridges in the United States
Steel bridges in the United States
Box girder bridges in the United States